Enzo Barlocco (born 16 February 1944) is an Italian water polo player. He competed in the men's tournament at the 1968 Summer Olympics.

References

External links
 

1944 births
Living people
Italian male water polo players
Olympic water polo players of Italy
Water polo players at the 1968 Summer Olympics
Water polo players from Genoa